Daniel Sarokon (January 27, 1927 - January 1, 2006) was a NASA Launch Conductor, described as 'one of the most influential people in the history of space travel. His first launch was that of the Moon probe Surveyor 1 and in his career he supervised 30 lunar and planetary missions.

The launch of the New Horizons Pluto mission in January 2006 was dedicated in his honour.

See also
List of New Horizons topics

References

External links
Article about the New Horizons launch and Sarokon

1928 births
2006 deaths
NASA people
American aerospace engineers
New Horizons